Constantin-Bogdan Dinescu (born in Bucharest, Romania), known by his stage name Macanache, is a Romanian hip-hop singer.

Biography
Macanache was born in Bucharest and spent his childhood in the neighborhood of Titan until he was 14 years old.  Forced by financial shortcomings, his family had to sell their house and move to a small apartment in the Berceni neighborhood. He currently supports his family by working as a bartender. He rose to popularity, as an independent artist, in 2015 when he launched the video for the song "Asta sunt eu". His style is relaxed and very sincere with vulgar and thug-like language on an educational comic tone. A genuine character of his time and one of the simplest and most passionate performers of Rap music in Hip Hop culture. In 2017, Macanache was featured on Delia's "Rămâi cu bine", which charted highly in Romania. Later in 2017, Macanache, accepted Phunk B's invitation and joined the band "4 Grasi" along Dilimanjaro and NCTK.  4G.

Singles
 Ăsta sunt eu (This Is Me)
 În fiecare zi (Every Day)
 Putred (Rotten)
 Șefu (Da Boss)
 Prietenii (The Friends)
 O joacă de copii (Cakewalk)
 Original
 Îți arăt că pot (I'll Show You I Can!)
 Ghinion (Bad Luck)
 E ce trebe? (Is It What It's Gotta Be?)
 Sufletwo (Soul-two)
 O cheamă (Her Name Is)
 Interzis (Forbidden)
 Banu' e dușmanu (The Money Is The Enemy)
 Sofia
 Eu dau Graffiti (I Do Graffiti)
 Mesajul (The Message)
 E sănătos (It's Healthy)
 Bucarest Stail (Bucharest Style)
 O Mamă (A Mother)
 Diana
 Trei Chestii (Three Things)

Discography
Interzis (2015)
Comedia (2016)
Macadopere (2017)
Moft (2018)
Legea (2019)
La Misto (2020)
Bodega (2020)
Geamanu (2020)
2 Hard 2 Bite (2021)

Comedia 2016Comedia''''' is the second album released by Romanian independent hip hop artist Macanache. The album was released in the same day and at the same event as the album Interzis. This album includes singles such as "Prietenii", "Sofia" and "Bucarest Stail". It also features three remixes to the next traks:
 O Joaca de Copii by Sanchez (with the original a cappella)
 Bucarest Stail by Avram (with the original a cappella)
 Prietenii by RIPP

Track listing

References

External links
 Macanache's Facebook profile
 Macanache's channel on YouTube

Romanian rappers
Musicians from Bucharest
Living people
1988 births